"Rosalita" is a 1942 song performed by Al Dexter and His Troopers. It was recorded on March 18, 1942 at the CBS Studio at Radio Station KNX, Sunset Blvd., Hollywood, California with session musicians Frank Marvin, Johnny Bond and Dick Reinhart. It was released on Okeh Records #6708 in March 1943, paired with "Pistol Packin' Mama". After the "Most Played Jukebox Folk Records" chart was established on January 8, 1944., it remained for six months, peaking at #1 on March 11, 1944.

References

1942 songs
1943 singles
Songs written by Al Dexter